The 23rd parallel north is a circle of latitude that is 23 degrees north of the Earth's equatorial plane, about  south of the Tropic of Cancer. It crosses Africa, Asia, the Indian Ocean, the Pacific Ocean, North America, the Caribbean and the Atlantic Ocean.

At this latitude the sun is visible for 13 hours, 33 minutes during the summer solstice and 10 hours, 43 minutes during the winter solstice.

Around the world
Starting at the Prime Meridian and heading eastwards, the parallel 23° north passes through:

{| class="wikitable plainrowheaders"
! scope="col" width="125" | Co-ordinates
! scope="col" | Country, territory or sea
! scope="col" | Notes
|-
| 
! scope="row" | 
|
|-
| 
! scope="row" | 
|
|-
| 
! scope="row" | 
|
|-
| 
! scope="row" | 
| 
|-
| 
! scope="row" | 
|
|-
| 
! scope="row" | 
|
|-valign="top"
| 
! scope="row" | Hala'ib Triangle
| Claimed by both Egypt and Sudan - Egypt controls the territory
|-
| style="background:#b0e0e6;" | 
! scope="row" style="background:#b0e0e6;" | Red Sea
| style="background:#b0e0e6;" |
|-
| 
! scope="row" | 
|
|-
| 
! scope="row" | 
| Emirate of Abu Dhabi
|-
| 
! scope="row" | 
|
|-
| style="background:#b0e0e6;" | 
! scope="row" style="background:#b0e0e6;" | Indian Ocean
| style="background:#b0e0e6;" | Arabian Sea
|-valign="top"
| 
! scope="row" | 
| Gujarat - passing just south of Ahmedabad Madhya Pradesh Chhattisgarh Jharkhand West Bengal
|-
| 
! scope="row" | 
|
|-
| 
! scope="row" | 
| Tripura - for about 
|-
| 
! scope="row" | 
|
|-
| 
! scope="row" | 
| Mizoram
|-
| 
! scope="row" |  (Burma)
|
|-
| 
! scope="row" | 
| Yunnan
|-
| 
! scope="row" | 
| 
|-
| 
! scope="row" | 
| Guangxi  Guangdong — passing just south of Guangzhou
|-
| style="background:#b0e0e6;" | 
! scope="row" style="background:#b0e0e6;" | South China Sea
| style="background:#b0e0e6;" |
|-
| 
! scope="row" | (Taiwan)
| Passing through Tainan
|-
| style="background:#b0e0e6;" | 
! scope="row" style="background:#b0e0e6;" | Pacific Ocean
| style="background:#b0e0e6;" | Passing just south of the island of Nihoa, Hawaii, 
|-
| 
! scope="row" | 
| Baja California peninsula
|-
| style="background:#b0e0e6;" | 
! scope="row" style="background:#b0e0e6;" | Gulf of California
| style="background:#b0e0e6;" | 
|-
| 
! scope="row" | 
|
|-
| style="background:#b0e0e6;" | 
! scope="row" style="background:#b0e0e6;" | Gulf of Mexico
| style="background:#b0e0e6;" |
|-
| 
! scope="row" | 
| Passing just south of Havana
|-
| style="background:#b0e0e6;" | 
! scope="row" style="background:#b0e0e6;" | Atlantic Ocean
| style="background:#b0e0e6;" |
|-
| 
! scope="row" | 
| Long Island
|-valign="top"
| style="background:#b0e0e6;" | 
! scope="row" style="background:#b0e0e6;" | Atlantic Ocean
| style="background:#b0e0e6;" | Passing just north of Crooked Island,  Passing just south of Samana Cay, 
|-
| 
! scope="row" | Western Sahara
| Claimed by 
|-
| 
! scope="row" | 
|
|-
| 
! scope="row" | 
|
|-
| 
! scope="row" | 
|
|}

See also
24th parallel north
Tropic of Cancer
22nd parallel north

References

n23